Torpes is a commune in the Doubs department in the Bourgogne-Franche-Comté region in eastern France.

Geography
It is perched on a plateau 20 to 40 m above the river.

Population

See also
 Communes of the Doubs department

References

External links

 Torpes on the regional Web site 

Communes of Doubs